Liquid Death is a canned-water company founded by Mike Cessario. Its tagline is "murder your thirst". The drink is sold in a  "tallboy" drink can. Its water is canned by the Austrian beverage company Starzinger in the Upper Austrian town of Frankenmarkt (altitude 1,759 ft). The drink began selling to consumers on its website in January 2019.

Products
The drink is sold in a  "tallboy" drink can. Its water is sourced from the Austrian Alps, where it is also canned. It is canned by the Austrian beverage company Starzinger in the Upper Austrian town of Frankenmarkt (altitude 1,759 ft). In 2020, the brand introduced a sparkling water variety. Its manufacturer is Supplying Demand, Inc. In addition to the original sparkling water, Liquid Death also introduced three flavored carbonated beverages including Mango Chainsaw, Severed Lime, and Berry It Alive. Unlike their unflavored seltzer these flavored carbonated beverages (“sparkling waters”) are actually akin to all-natural, low-calorie sodas as they not only contained added natural flavorings/extracts but also  acidulants and some added sugar (from agave nectar) as well. In March 2023, the company announced sale of three tea flavors: Armless Palmer, Grim Leafer, and Rest in Peach, which contain agave nectar and 30 mgs of caffeine.

Liquid Death is also a producer of NFTs, which they called Murder Head Death Club.

History
Delaware native Mike Cessario, a graphic designer who previously worked as a Netflix creative director, was inspired to create Liquid Death after watching a Vans Warped Tour in 2009, in which concert goers would drink water out of Monster Energy cans to stay hydrated. Cessario stated he wondered why no one had marketed water in a manner similar to Monster. For marketing, Cessario emphasized interestingness, which he believed would transition into organic shares on social media. 

The company originated with Cessario and three other partners, including a bartender and an artist. Before he and his partners chose the name Liquid Death, they thought over different names for the company such as "Southern Thunder". Cessario filed a trademark application for the term "Liquid Death" with the United States Patent and Trademark Office on July 6, 2017. He produced a video advertisement to gauge market interest in the product, which received three million views before the water was available to consumers for purchase. Within a few months of release, the company had over 100,000 "likes" on Facebook, more than brands such as Aquafina had generated in their history on the platform.

In 2019, Cessario stated the company's plan was to expand to bars, tattoo parlors, and certain barber shops in Los Angeles and Philadelphia as a "lifestyle play". Cessario stated the brand was initially marketed towards straight edge adherents and fans of heavy metal music and punk rock. The drink began selling to consumers on its website in January 2019. Liquid Death raised US$1.6 million in seed funding from a round led by Science Inc. in 2019 (for a total amount raised to $2.25 million at that point), $9 million in a series A round in February 2020, and $23 million in a series B round in September 2020.

In February 2020, the brand expanded into Whole Foods Market in the United States, where according to Eater it became "the fastest-selling water brand on its shelves". In August 2020, the brand expanded into two hundred 7-Eleven stores in the Los Angeles and San Diego markets as part of a trial run. In May 2021, the company raised an additional $15 million in a Series C funding round completed with Live Nation, who said they would sell the drink exclusively in their events and venues for a period of time. As of December 2021, the drink began selling in large supermarket chains such as Publix and Sprouts stores. In January 2022, the company raised $75 million in Series C funding. The company received a $525 million valuation at the time. 

Cessario stated that the company's revenue rose to $45 million in 2021, with revenue projected at $130 million for 2022. In October 2022, the company raised a round led by Science for $70 million at a $700 million valuation, though according to Dan Primack of Axios, the valuation could be viewed "skeptically" as it was an insider-led round.

Promotions
In May 2020, the company released Greatest Hates, an album of death metal music created with lyrics from hate comments the company received online; a second album of hate comments, described as "punk rock", was released in November. In February 2022, during Super Bowl LVI, the company released an advertisement featuring children enjoying the beverage with Judas Priest's song "Breaking the Law". Parodying advertisements for alcoholic beverages,  the advertisement ends with the tagline – "Don't be scared, it's just water".

See also
List of bottled water brands

Notes

References

External links

Bottled water brands
2019 establishments in the United States